Dieter Stein (born 1967 in Ingolstadt) is a German journalist, publisher, editor-in-chief and founder of the right wing newspaper Junge Freiheit. He is associated with the German New Right.

Stein grew up in Bavaria and Baden-Württemberg and studied political science and history at Albert Ludwigs University of Freiburg from 1989 to 1993. In 1986, Stein founded the Junge Freiheit as a reaction to the "dominance of the leftist '68 generation". In 1990, Stein founded the Junge Freiheit Verlag GmbH, a publisher for his newspaper. He became the CEO of the company. The newspaper has been published in Berlin since 1994.

Stein is married and has 4 children.

Works
Dieter Stein: "Phantom Neue Rechte' - Die Geschichte eines politischen Begriffs und sein Mißbrauch durch den Verfassungsschutz". Berlin, 2005.  
Dieter Stein (ed.): Rettet die deutsche Sprache. Beiträge, Interviews und Materialien zum Kampf gegen Rechtschreibreform und Anglizismen''. Berlin, Oktober 2004.

References

1967 births
Living people
People from Ingolstadt
German journalists
German newspaper editors
New Right (Europe)